Laurent Quiévreux (born 10 March 1979) is a French football referee and former player. He played as goalkeeper for clubs in France's Ligue 1 and Ligue 2 and in Portugal before ending his playing career in 2010. He passed examinations to become a referee in 2011.

References

1979 births
Living people
French footballers
Paris Saint-Germain F.C. players
FC Istres players
U.D. Leiria players
Clermont Foot players
Association football goalkeepers